Mount Pinchot is the highest peak in the Wichita Mountains Wildlife Refuge of Southwest Oklahoma at 2,476 feet (755 m) above sea level. It is located toward the western edge of the WMWR. The US Fish and Wildlife Service is responsible for the maintenance of the area. Mount Pinchot is located within the Wildlife Refuge's Special Use Area and is closed to the public. Special wildlife viewing tours are offered by the Refuge which take participants very near the base of the mountain.

The highest peak in the Wichita Mountains (including areas outside the Refuge) is Haley Peak, at 2,481 ft (756 m). Haley Peak (officially unnamed) is located on private property just outside the NW corner of the Refuge. [Haley Peak Elevation information from records stored at USGS/NSDI Standards Team/NGTOC III/Mid-Continent Mapping Center/Rolla MO.]

Mount Pinchot was named in honor of Gifford Pinchot who served as the first Chief of the United States Forest Service.

References 

Landforms of Comanche County, Oklahoma
Pinchot